Ithomia amarilla is an ithomiine butterfly from the subfamily Danainae, described by Richard Haensch in 1903. It is found in Ecuador.

Gallery

References

Nymphalidae of South America
Ithomiini
Butterflies described in 1903
Taxa named by Richard Haensch